Earby is a town and civil parish within the Borough of Pendle, Lancashire, England. Although within the boundaries of the historic West Riding of Yorkshire, Earby has been administered by Lancashire County Council since 1974 and regularly celebrates its Yorkshire roots. The parish had a population of 4,538 recorded in the 2011 census,

History

From 1909 to 1974, Earby formed an urban district. Since 1974 Earby has been in the West Craven area of Pendle, has a town council, and is part of the West Craven Area Committee on Pendle Borough Council.

Nearby places include Thornton in Craven and Barnoldswick.

Earby also had its own railway station, but it was closed in 1970. The station was an interchange with the small branch to Barnoldswick. It has a daily bus service (280) between Preston and Skipton operated by Stagecoach together with a daily bus service (M5) from Barnoldswick to Burnley provided by The Burnley Bus Company (Transdev)'.

The Yorkshire Dales Lead Mining Museum was based in the old Grade II* listed Grammar School building. This closed in January 2016. The Robert Windle's Foundation, a charity established in the 1600s, and original owners of the building have now taken back control and are working to establish a community hub and café for the benefit of the residents of the locality.

Local media
BBC North West and ITV (Granada Television) are both received directly from the main Winter Hill transmitter. The BBC has a  relay that overlooks Earby and has the four main BBC national FM radio stations (Radio 1 to 4). Fresh Radio in Skipton covers the area on MW 1413 kHz.

The local press is published weekly; the Barnoldswick and Earby Times is published on Fridays and is covered at Pendle Today. Some of the Yorkshire press is circulated in the area – due to the geographical anomaly. The Craven Herald & Pioneer and Yorkshire Post are prominent.

In 2012, a local radio station was broadcast for the first time: West Craven Community Radio, an online based station serving the community of West Craven area of Pendle and beyond, including listeners afar as San Francisco and Malaysia.
The station, run by non-paid volunteers, was originally broadcast three days a week.  In December 2012, it was broadcasting on four days a week including Friday evenings.  In 2013, it was hoping to raise enough money for an FM licence from Ofcom.  However, there is no current radio station on analogue radio licensed specifically for Earby as a commercial radio station and no community radio station for the same area with a licence from Ofcom.

See also

Listed buildings in Earby

References

External links

Earby Town Council

Towns and villages in the Borough of Pendle
Civil parishes in Lancashire
History of Yorkshire
Towns in Lancashire